Barretta is a surname. Notable people with the surname include:

Bill Barretta (born 1964), American performer
Gene Barretta (born 1960), American author, illustrator, animator, and character designer
Larry Barretta, American football player

Surnames of Italian origin